Michał Grunt (born 10 September 1993) is a Polish professional footballer playing as a forward.

Club career
Born in Sosnowiec, Grunt made his professional debut with local club Zaglebie Sosnowiec, scoring a goal on that match. He then signed for Polonia Warszawa. A lack of first team opportunities saw him return to his old club the following season. He became the topscorer for the reserve team.

On 5 July 2013, he signed for Braga B, playing in Segunda Liga (second tier of Portuguese football) on a four-year contract. On 7 December, he scored his debut goal for his club in a 2–1 defeat to Maritimo B. On 22 August 2016, his contract at Braga was terminated, and he subsequently joined KSZO Ostrowiec Świętokrzyski.

On 28 January 2019, Grunt signed a contract with Motor Lublin. In January 2020 he was loaned out to his former club, KSZO Ostrowiec Świętokrzyski, for the rest of the season. After returning from loan, Grunt moved to Podhale Nowy Targ.

References

External links
 
 
 

1993 births
Living people
Association football forwards
People from Sosnowiec
Polish footballers
Polish expatriate footballers
Polonia Warsaw players
Zagłębie Sosnowiec players
GKS Katowice players
GKS Tychy players
Motor Lublin players
S.C. Braga B players
Limanovia Limanowa players
KSZO Ostrowiec Świętokrzyski players
Ekstraklasa players
II liga players
III liga players
Liga Portugal 2 players
Sportspeople from Silesian Voivodeship
Expatriate footballers in Portugal
Polish expatriate sportspeople in Portugal